Gadai is a town and union council of Dera Ghazi Khan District in the Punjab province of Pakistan. It is located at 30°1'0N 70°37'0E and has an altitude of 114 metres (377 feet).

Notable people  
 Mehmood Khan Leghari
 Maulana Muhammad khan Leghari

References

Populated places in Dera Ghazi Khan District
Union councils of Dera Ghazi Khan District
Cities and towns in Punjab, Pakistan